Ngayon Kaya (Maybe Today) is a 2022 Filipino romance drama film directed by Prime Cruz and starring Paulo Avelino and Janine Gutierrez under production company T.Rex Entertainment and WASD Films. The film was released on June 22, 2022. The production of this film took place between September 2019 to January 2020 before the Coronavirus Pandemic occurred. It was originally set to be released in April 2020 for the Metro Manila Summer Festival, but was moved to an April 21, 2022 release. This release of the film was once again postponed before it finally hit theaters on June 22, 2022.

The film was made available for streaming on Netflix in November 2022.

Plot 
Five years after going their separate ways, close friends Harold and AM unexpectedly reunite after arriving late at the wedding of their friends, Justin and Charmaigne. Old feelings resurface as the two reflect on their almost decade-long friendship, pretend to live the lives taken away by their clashing dreams and obligations, and lament their many "what could have beens." Will they get it right this time around, or will they have to go on wondering what life would've been like if they didn't let their chance pass them by a second time?

Cast and characters 
Paulo Avelino as Harold Coquia
Janine Gutierrez as Amihan "AM" Fernandez
Alwyn Uytingco as Justin
John James Uy as Jet
Donna Cariaga as Charmaigne
Rio Locsin as Espie
Joel Ferrer as Angcoy
Juan Miguel Severo as Motmot
Shara Dizon as Grace
Kych Minemoto as Mikel
Iana Bernardez as Anastasia
John Timmons as Arric
Samantha Lee as Nix
Brian Sy as Red
Gabby Padilla as Nina
Adrianna So as Issa
VJ Mendoza as William
Via Antonio as DJ Natasha
Boo Ganunada
Nestor Abrogena
Yuna Chanel Tangog
Marxie Madlen Fadul
Shannel Fama
Ranty Portento
Mayonnaise
Ang Bandang Shirley
Typecast

References 

Filipino-language films
2022 romance films
Philippine romantic drama films
2022 romantic drama films